Smithdale is an unincorporated community located in Amite County, Mississippi, United States.

Smithdale has a post office with a zip code of 39664.

Notable people
 Britte Hughey, member of the Mississippi House of Representatives from 1956 to 1964
 Doug Williams, gospel singer
 Franklin Delano Williams, gospel singer.
 Melvin Williams, gospel musician

References

Unincorporated communities in Amite County, Mississippi
Unincorporated communities in Mississippi
McComb micropolitan area